Mary Louise Brown (1868 – March 9, 1927) was a physician and teacher who devoted over 25 years of her life to servicing the Black community of Washington D.C. Brown was the first African-American woman to receive a wartime medical commission when she joined the Red Cross in 1918 during World War I. Brown graduated from the Howard University College of Medicine and comingled her teaching career at Black community high schools and normal schools with a medical career, often providing medical care for free.

Early life 
Brown was born in 1868 in Baltimore, Maryland and raised in a family with eight other siblings. Her father, John Mifflin Brown was a bishop in the African Methodist Episcopal Church. As he was frequently reassigned to different churches and was involved in the establishment of various educational and social institutions in the South, the family frequently moved. The children were "talented" and raised in the spirit of post-Civil War Reconstruction. New opportunities for African Americans arose, and along with her brothers and sisters, Mary Brown sought a professional career.

In the 1880s, Brown graduated from the [ in Washington D.C., which, as with every Normal School of the time, provided an opportunity to begin teaching in the city's schools. Brown started teaching English at a high school in the city's Black community.

Medical career 
While teaching during the day, Brown attended evening classes at the historically Black Howard University. She graduated from Normal department of the university; then, following in the footsteps of her older brother John Mifflin Jr, Brown attended Medical college from 1894 to 1898. Her graduating class of 1898 produced 32 M.D.'s, three of which were women. In an "unprecedented" move at the time for women of color, Brown continued on to post-graduate medical education, traveling to Scotland to complete courses at the University of Edinburgh in 1899 and 1900.

Upon her return to Washington D.C. Brown settled at 1813 Vermont Avenue NW, where she would reside until her death. Brown combined medical and teaching careers, teaching in the mornings and practicing medicine in the afternoons. She devoted over 25 years of her life in service to the Black community of Washington D.C. At the time, an advanced degree earned teachers higher pay. In Brown's case, her medical degree enabled her to transition from a high school teacher of English to a science teacher at a normal school, which precipitated a significant pay increase — from $650 per year to $1000 per year, ($20,100 and $31,000 respectively in 2020 dollars.)

Red Cross Commission 
During World War I, in February 1918, Brown received a commission to join the Red Cross in France. She left for France on March 1, 1918 to care for wounded soldiers. The commissions to Brown and other women were lobbied for by the American Medical Women's Association (AMWA) and National American Woman Suffrage Association (NAWSA). Brown's appointment was noted in media across the country as the first military medical commission awarded to a Black woman. In 1918, the Red Cross and the US Army commissioned approximately 80 women, only two of which, including Brown, were women of color. At the time, women's organizations advocated for such personnel to receive military service records (as was customary for military doctors of other countries involved in World War I). However, this effort was unsuccessful, and in most cases, including Brown's, no such records were received.

Social services and activism 
Brown played an active role in the Black community of Washington D.C., often volunteering her medical services. She was in contact with leading women's organizations of the day, including AMWA and NAWSA, which lobbied for Brown's wartime commission in 1918. She was also in touch with Katherine D. Tillman of the National Association of Colored Women and later with the National Association for the Advancement of Colored People.

Death 
Brown died in her home at 1813 Vermont Avenue NW on March 9, 1927, at the age of 59. Her death was described as "sudden." She was buried at Woodlawn Cemetery on March 12, 1927.

See also 
 John Mifflin Brown
 Katherine D. Tillman
 Howard University
 Normal School for Colored Girls

Notes

References

Literature cited

External links 
The untold story of women who risked their lives to do good – and get their rights

African-American schoolteachers
African-American women physicians
African-American physicians
Howard University College of Medicine alumni
American women in World War I
People from Baltimore
People from Washington, D.C.
1868 births
1927 deaths
20th-century African-American women
20th-century African-American people